Faustina may refer to:

People

Saints
 Faustina Kowalska (1905–1938), Polish mystic, "Secretary of Divine Mercy"
 Saint Faustina and Saint Liberata of Como, 6th-century Italian nuns

Women from the Nerva–Antonine dynasty
 Rupilia Faustina, a daughter of Vitellia Galeria and the consul Lucius Scribonius Libo Rupilius Frugi Bonus
 Faustina the Elder (died c. 140), Annia Galeria Faustina Major, daughter of Rupilia Faustina and Marcus Annius Verus; wife of Emperor Antoninus Pius
 Faustina the Younger (2nd century – 175), Annia Galeria Faustina Minor, daughter of Faustina the Elder and Antoninus Pius; wife of Emperor Marcus Aurelius
 Annia Cornificia Faustina (123–152), cousin of Faustina to Younger and sister to Marcus Aurelius
 Annia Fundania Faustina (died 192), cousin of Faustina the Younger and Marcus Aurelius
 Ummidia Cornificia Faustina (141–182), daughter of Annia Cornificia Faustina and niece of Marcus Aurelius
 Vitrasia Faustina (died c. 180), daughter of Annia Fundania Faustina
 Annia Galeria Aurelia Faustina (147 – 2nd century), first-born daughter of Faustina the Younger and Marcus Aurelius
 Annia Cornificia Faustina Minor (160–212), another sister of Annia Aurelia Galeria Faustina
 Annia Faustina (daughter of Ummidia Cornificia Faustina) (165 – c. 210), noblewoman of Anatolian Roman descent and a wealthy heiress who lived in the Roman Empire
 Annia Faustina or Annia Aurelia Faustina, the great, granddaughter of Marcus Aurelius and Faustina the Younger, the third wife of Roman Emperor Elagabalus

Other Roman women
 Faustina (wife of Constantius II)
 Faustina Constantia, daughter of Faustina and Constantius
 Faustina, a hagiographical version of Empress Valeria Maximilla, supposedly converted by St. Catherine of Alexandria

Other people
 Faustina Agolley, Australian television music presenter
 Faustina Acheampong, First Lady of the Republic of Ghana
 Faustina Bordoni (1697–1781), Baroque-era soprano nicknamed "Faustina"
 Faustina Maratti (c. 1670–1745), Italian Baroque poet and painter
 Faustina Sáez de Melgar (1834–1895), Spanish writer and journalist
 Faustina Pignatelli (died 1785), Italian physicist
 Doc Faustina (born 1939), NASCAR driver

Fictional characters
 Faustina, a character in the 1969 novel A Void

Other uses
 Faustina (1957 film), a 1957 Spanish comedy
 Faustina (1968 film), an Italian comedy
 Faustina (1995 film), a Polish religious drama
 Faustine (1991 novel), by Emma Tennant
 Faustina (gastropod), a subgenus of Chilostoma gastropods
 Faustina (play), a 1948 drama by Paul Goodman